Liberato Marcial Rojas Cabral (17 August 1870, Asunción – 22 August 1922) was provisional President of Paraguay from July 6, 1911 to February 28, 1912. He was President of the Senate of Paraguay at the time of becoming the President of the Republic. A journalist, he was a member of the Liberal Party.

References

External links
 List of Presidents of Paraguay, worldstatesmen.org

1870 births
1922 deaths
People from Asunción
Paraguayan people of Spanish descent
Liberal Party (Paraguay) politicians
Presidents of Paraguay
Presidents of the Senate of Paraguay
Paraguayan journalists
Male journalists